Transmembrane protein 134 is a protein encoded by the TMEM134 gene.  TMEM134 does not have any other known aliases.  There are two transmembrane domains and a domain of unknown function (DUF872). Evolutionary, the majority of the organisms that have this gene are primates and mammals, although there are some organisms dating back to Drosophila and C. elegans.  Through current research, there has not been any confirmed function of TMEM134.

Gene Structure 

The gene is composed of 6 exons spanning from 67464348 to 67469277 kilo bases.  It is located on chromosome 11q13.2, which is the minus strand of the chromosome.  The gene does have three isoforms; a, b, and c.

Protein

Protein Structure 

The protein is encoded by TMEM134 gene and is 195 amino acids in length.  The protein contains two transmembrane domains but does not contain a signal peptide.  This suggests that there is an internal signal peptide upstream of the translated portion of the protein.  The protein is overall considering normal with its amino acid content but does have two regions of high hydrophobicity, which occur during the transmembrane regions of the protein.  This gives the protein an isoelectric point of 6.08. The overall weight of the protein is 21.6 kilodaltons, which is conserved throughout the different orthologs.  The protein also contains a domain of unknown function 872 (DUF872).  Currently there is no thought to the possible function of this domain.

Regulation and Translation 

TMEM134 is regulated by the promoter GXP50275.  There are 870 amino acids in the promoter and 15 transcripts variants of it.  The promoter is well conserved in mammals.  There are some conserved binding regions in the promoter including EGR/nerve factor and Huntington's disease gene regulatory region.

Location 

The final protein is thought to be in the endoplasmic reticulum and the nuclear membrane.  The protein is anchored in two different regions, from 123-145 and 155-177.  The portion of the protein that extends into the cytosol is heavily phosphorylated.  These phosphorylation sites are conserved into bony fishes.

Post-Translational Modification 

The only post-translational modification that occurs is phosphorylation.  There is no glycosylation, sulfination, or sumoylation sites.

Interactions 

TMEM134 has one interaction with another protein, ELAVL1.  This protein binds to AU rich elements in FOS and IL3/interleukin-3 mRNAs.

Expression 

Microarray analysis of GEO profiles were conducted and TMEM134 is shown to be ubiquitously expressed in the majority of human tissues. Even though there is ubiquitous expression in the human tissues, there are other tissues that have higher expression levels, such as the heart, breast tissue, and prostate tissue.

Homology 

As discussed earlier, there is quite a bit of conservation in primates and mammals but there are some distant orthologs of zebrafish and Drosophila, and a homolog of C. elegans.

References 

Human proteins